Danny Taberner (born 17 June 1993) is an English semi-professional footballer who plays as a goalkeeper for Runcorn Linnets.

Career
Taberner became Rochdale's youngest ever goalkeeper when, on 11 November 2009, he made his debut in a 2–0 home defeat in the FA Cup to Luton Town. Taberner was sixty-six days younger than Stephen Bywater, the previous youngest Rochdale 'keeper.

In August 2012 he joined Salford City  after a spell at  Stockport Sports.

In the 2018–19 season he joined Northwich Victoria.

He re-joined Atherton Collieries in March 2020.

In October 2021 he joined City of Liverpool.  He re-joined Atherton Collieries later that season.

In July 2022, Taberner joined Runcorn Linnets.

References

External links

1993 births
Living people
Footballers from Bolton
English footballers
Association football goalkeepers
Rochdale A.F.C. players
Salford City F.C. players
Stockport Sports F.C. players
Atherton Collieries A.F.C. players
Prestwich Heys A.F.C. players
Ramsbottom United F.C. players
Northwich Victoria F.C. players
City of Liverpool F.C. players
Runcorn Linnets F.C. players
Northern Premier League players